The La Plata Mountains are a small subrange of the San Juan Mountains in the southwestern part of Colorado, United States. Their name is Spanish for silver.

The peaks of the range are easily visible from U.S. Route 160, which skirts the range on the south. The La Plata River and the Mancos River have their headwaters in the range. The Colorado Trail accesses even towards the northern peaks.

The best-known and highest peak in the La Plata Mountains is Hesperus Mountain, which is the Navajo sacred mountain of the north. The six of the highest summits are listed below.

Six highest peaks 
 Hesperus Mountain, 
 Lavender Peak, 
 Mount Moss, 
 Babcock Peak, 
 Centennial Peak, 13,062 ft (3,981 m)
 Burwell Peak,

See also

Mountain ranges of Colorado

References

 
 Colorado Atlas and Gazetteer (1st ed.), DeLorme Publishing, 1991, .

Mountain ranges of Colorado
Ranges of the Rocky Mountains
San Juan Mountains (Colorado)
Landforms of La Plata County, Colorado
Landforms of Montezuma County, Colorado